The Man In The Red Coat is a book by Julian Barnes. It was published on 11 November 2019. The book concerns Samuel Jean de Pozzi, a French surgeon and pioneer in the field of gynaecology whose portrait in a red coat John Singer Sargent painted, and other people of Belle Époque Paris, including Robert de Montesquiou, Prince Edmond de Polignac, Jean Lorrain, Sarah Bernhardt, Joris-Karl Huysmans, and Oscar Wilde.

References

2019 non-fiction books
British biographies
English non-fiction books
Works by Julian Barnes
Jonathan Cape books